Punatitan (meaning "puna giant") is a genus of titanosaurian sauropod dinosaur from the Late Cretaceous Ciénaga del Río Huaco Formation of La Rioja, Argentina. It contains one species, Punatitan coughlini.

Etymology 
The generic name Punatitan refers to the oxygen-depleted atmosphere characteristic of the Andes. The specific name refers to geologist Tim Coughlin, who first reported dinosaur fossils in the discovery locality.

Description 

Classification 
The describers' phylogenetic analysis places Punatitan as a derived member of the Lithostrotia, in the clade Aeolosaurini, which they recover as a subclade of Rinconsauria, opposite to other analyses. Notably, Punatitan was recovered within a clade consisting of two species of the genus Aeolosaurus, but the describers refrained from assigning it to said genus, instead regarding the more basal species' ("A." maximus) placement in Aeolosaurus dubious. However, with the reassignment of "Aeolosaurus" maximus to the genus Arrudatitan in 2021, Punatitan's generic separation could be justified.

Their cladogram is shown below:

Paleoenvironment 
The holotype locality, the Quebrada de Santo Domingo site, preserves one of the largest concentrations of titanosaur eggs in the world. The describing authors suggest some connection with either Punatitan or its contemporary Bravasaurus, which was described in the same paper.

References 

Lithostrotians
Late Cretaceous dinosaurs of South America
Cretaceous Argentina
Fossil taxa described in 2020